In enzymology, a 3-hydroxy-2-methylbutyryl-CoA dehydrogenase is an enzyme that catalyzes the chemical reaction

(2S,3S)-3-hydroxy-2-methylbutanoyl-CoA + NAD+  2-methylacetoacetyl-CoA + NADH + H+

Thus, the two substrates of this enzyme are (2S,3S)-3-hydroxy-2-methylbutanoyl-CoA and NAD+, whereas its 3 products are 2-methylacetoacetyl-CoA, NADH, and H+.

This enzyme belongs to the family of oxidoreductases, specifically those acting on the CH-OH group of donor with NAD+ or NADP+ as acceptor. The systematic name of this enzyme class is (2S,3S)-3-hydroxy-2-methylbutanoyl-CoA:NAD+ oxidoreductase. Other names in common use include 2-methyl-3-hydroxybutyryl coenzyme A dehydrogenase, 2-methyl-3-hydroxybutyryl coenzyme A dehydrogenase, and 2-methyl-3-hydroxy-butyryl CoA dehydrogenase. This enzyme participates in valine, leucine and isoleucine degradation.

Structural studies

References

 

EC 1.1.1
NADH-dependent enzymes
Enzymes of known structure